Meni is a Jewish given name. Notable people with the name include:

Meni Koretski (born 1974), Israeli footballer and manager
Meni Levi (born 1980), Israeli footballer
Meni Mazuz (born 1955), Israeli jurist and Supreme Court justice

Other people called Meni:
Meni, an ancient Egyptian high official and priest

See also
Menis

Jewish given names